John Norman was Mayor of London.

He was appointed a Sheriff of the City of London in 1234 and elected mayor in 1250.

According to Burke, Norman's coat of arms is blazoned: Argent on a chief sable three leopards faces or.

See also
List of Lord Mayors of London
List of Sheriffs of London

References

Sheriffs of the City of London
13th-century mayors of London